Banat (The Journey), originally titled Banat (Il viaggio), is a 2015 Italian-Romanian-Bulgarian-Macedonian drama film written and directed by Adriano Valerio, at his feature film debut. It premiered in the International Critics’ Week section at the 72nd edition of the Venice Film Festival.

Plot 
Ivo, an agronomist from Brindisi and with no job opportunities, agrees to move to Banat, a region of Romania, where he has just been hired by local farmers. Here he will be joined by Clara, a boat restorer, met just before leaving Italy. The two will embark on a journey to rediscover themselves that will lead them to discover new horizons.

Cast   
 Edoardo Gabbriellini as Ivo
 Elena Radonicich as Clara
  Stefan Velniciuc  as Ion
 Piera Degli Esposti as Miss Nitti
  Ovanes Torosian as  Christian

Production
Elena Radonicich was five months pregnant in real life during filming, so the director changed part of the story and adapted the character to the actress.

See also    
 List of Italian films of 2015

References

External links  

 
2015 directorial debut films
2015 films
2015 drama films
Italian drama films
Romanian drama films
Bulgarian drama films
Macedonian drama films
Films about immigration
2010s Italian films